Larry Stimpert is an American academic administrator, currently serving as the 25th president of Hampden–Sydney College.

Early life and education
Stimpert earned a Bachelor of Arts in Economics from Illinois Wesleyan University. He earned a master in business administration from the Columbia Business School of Columbia University, and a PhD from the University of Illinois at Urbana-Champaign.

Career
Stimpert began his career at Norfolk Southern Corporation and the Chicago and North Western Transportation Company.
He is the co-author of a leading text on strategic management entitled Strategic Thinking:Today's Business Imperative from Routledge.
Stimpert was a professor of economics and finance at Colorado College, followed by DePauw University, where he was also vice president for academic affairs. He has served as the 25th president of Hampden–Sydney College since 2016. In February 2018, he launched a $50-million-dollar fundraising campaign for the institution.

Personal life
Stimpert and his wife, Lesley, have two children.

References

Living people
Illinois Wesleyan University alumni
Columbia Business School alumni
University of Illinois Urbana-Champaign alumni
Colorado College faculty
DePauw University faculty
Presidents of Hampden–Sydney College
Year of birth missing (living people)